Amina Abubakar Bello is the First Lady of Niger State and a Nigerian obstetrician and gynaecologist.

Background 
Bello was born in Benin City, Edo State, Nigeria in 1973. She is the daughter of former Niger State Chief Judge Justice Fati Lami Abubakar and former Head of State General Abdulsalami Abubakar. She is married to Niger State Governor Abubakar Sani Bello. She received her education in Nigeria and the United Kingdom. She is a physician who specializes in obstetrics and gynecology.  

When her husband was sworn in as Governor of Niger State, Bello provided voluntary service at the General Hospital Minna, where she attends to patients.

In 2016, Bello established the Raise foundation. The organization has been advocating for better health for women, particularly in the areas of breast and cervical cancer screening and treatment, emphasizing that cervical cancer is the fourth largest cause of death among women and affects around 4.1 million people. Furthermore, at least 80% of those infected are from low- and middle-income nations such as Nigeria. 

As part of her advocacy on breast cancer campaigns, Bello identified the vital role played by religious leaders, saying “We need to differentiate between religion and our health. We cannot go to Church or Mosque for our pastors and imams to treat us for cancer. Yes, we can pray because it is only God that can cure us, but God has given us the tools that we need to use to get that cure."  Bello, seeing the challenges nursing mothers are facing in the state advocated for the establishment of creches in  government and non-governmental organizations in Nigeria as that will ease the task of  exclusive breastfeeding among nursing mothers in their organizations. 

Through her foundation and with support from the Mainstream Foundation, Bello established a state of the art women development center in Kontagora  meant to provide health care services to women affected by Vesico Vegina Fistula (VVF). As the Chairperson of the state management committee on Gender Based Violence GBV Bello advocated for the enactment of laws against GBV in Niger State noting that there is the need to establish more referral centers in all the General Hospitals in the state to address the issue of rape and other abuses.  

On insecurity, Bello expressed her dismay on the inhumane treatment given to the Tagina boys while on captivity and  advised the victims not to allow the ugly incident demoralize them from going to school again. 

Bello during the commencement of the second phase of COVID-19 vaccination in Niger State urged the citizens to more conscious of the dangerous nature of pandemic.  She also shows her patriotism on having an indivisible Nigeria by calling on agitators and secessionists to have a rethink . 

Bello is also an advocate for Girl Child Education she is of the view that girls have globally proven over time that when allowed access to education, skill acquisition and opportunities they will not only be agents of change but positive role models in society.  Seeking for inclusiveness of women in appointed and elective position, Bello calls for a change of narration through both religious and traditional ways. 

In 2021 there were allegations over her NGOs involvement in selling of water to the residents of the state capital Minna which she debunk.

References 

1973 births
First Ladies of Nigeria
Nigerian women medical doctors
Living people